Lairenjam Olen is an Indian actor who predominantly appears in Manipuri films. He started as a Theatre Artist and was a member of Orient Drama Union, Imphal. His famous films include Dr. Yaima, Mittrang Keithel, Khongchat series, Radha-Rani, Lallasi Pal and Mr. Lakhipyari. He played double roles of Nganthoi and Thonba in the 2004 movie Icham Chamna.

In 2017, he won the 5th Zilla Parishad Panchayat election as a candidate of the Heingang Constituency.

Accolades
Olen bagged the Best Actor in Manipuri Film award at the North East TV People's Choice Awards 2004 held at Guwahati. He received the Best Male Actor Award for the years 2005–2007 given by Film Academy Manipur for his role in the film Nungshi Hekta Hairage. He is also the recipient of the Best Actor Award at the Festival of Manipur Cinema 2007 organised by Film Forum Manipur for the film Lallasi Pal. He won the Best Actor in a Supporting Role - Male at the 8th Manipur State Film Awards 2013 for his role of Ibomcha in the movie Thasi Thanou.

Selected filmography

References

External links
 

Living people
21st-century Indian male actors
Indian male film actors
Male actors from Manipur
Meitei people
People from Imphal
1973 births